The 1954 East Texas State Lions football team was an American football team that represented East Texas State Teachers College—now known as Texas A&M University–Commerce–as a member of the Lone Star Conference (LSC) during the 1954 college football season. Led by first-year head coach Jules V. Sikes, the Lions compiled an overall record of 6–3–1 with a mark of 5–0–1 in conference play, sharing the LSC title with Southwest Texas State.

Schedule

References

East Texas State
Texas A&M–Commerce Lions football seasons
Lone Star Conference football champion seasons
East Texas State Lions football